The rivers of Ecuador are an important part of the nation's geography and economy. Most of the over 2,000 rivers and streams have headwaters in the Andes mountain range, flowing therefrom either westward toward the Pacific Ocean or eastward toward the Amazon River. Narrow in the highlands, the majority of the rivers broaden as they reach the lower elevations of the Coast and Oriente. During the rainy season, which lasts from January to April, the rivers that drain into the Pacific flood and often cause damage.

Geography
The two main water systems are the Esmeraldas River in the North and the Guayas in the South.

The Esmeraldas begins as the Guayllabamba River in the Sierra, flowing west before emptying in the Pacific near the city of Esmeraldas.

The Guayas forms to the north of Guayaquil, where the Daule and the Babahoyo Rivers converge.  The Babahayo arises from its tributaries in the Andes.  The Guayas basin covers 40,000 square kilometers.

The most important rivers in the Oriente are the Pastaza, Napo, and Putumayo.  The Pastaza includes the Agoyan Waterfall, Ecuador's highest.

Economy
Prior to the arrival of Europeans, the indigenous people of Ecuador used the rivers for fishing and transportation, although frequent waterfalls limited canoe travel in the Andes.  The rivers long continued to be an important means of transportation, especially as the mountains made road and railroad building difficult.

Since the 20th century, rivers have become an important source of electric power in Ecuador.  As of 2006, hydroelectric dams have a capacity 1,750 megawatts.  Some critics have noted that these projects have tended to be "substantially oversized" without "delivering the promised energy benefits."  In 2008, President Rafael Correa announced that the government planned to build eleven new hydroelectric power plants.  Almost all of the dam projects face opposition from local communities that fear negative environmental impacts on the land and a lack of transparency in decision-making.

Recreational rafting on the rivers has become an important part of Ecuador's tourism-based economy.

Rivers
This listing is arranged by drainage basin, with respective tributaries indented under each larger stream's name.

Atlantic Ocean

 Putumayo River
 San Miguel River
 Napo River
 Curaray River
 Cononaco River
 Aguarico River
 Cuyabeno River
 Yasuní River
 Tiputini River
 Coca River
 Payamino River
Marañón River (Peru)
 Tigre River
 Corrientes River
 Conambo River
 Pintoyacu River or Pindoyacu
 Pastaza River
 Huasaga River
 Bobonaza River
 Palora River
 Chambo River
 Ambato River
 Cutuchi River
 Cebadas River
 Morona River
 Cangaime River
 Macuma River
 Santiago River
 Yaapi River
 Upano River
 Paute River
 Matadero River or Cuenca
 Machángara River
 Tomebamba River
 Tarqui River
 Yanuncay River
 Zamora River
 Chinchipe River

Pacific Ocean
 Carchi River
 Mira River
 San Juan River
 Chota River
 Cayapas River
 Santiago River 
 Onzole River
 Esmeraldas River
 Guayllabamba River
 Machángara River
 Blanco River
 Toachi River
 Quininde River
 Muisne River
 Cojimies River
 Mache River
 Coaque River
 Jama River
 Chone River
 Carrizal River
 Portoviejo River
 Jipijapa River
 Guayas River
 Taura River
 Daule River
 Pula River
 Magro River or Pedro Carbo
 Colimes River
 Boqueron River
 Puca River
 Congo River
 Babahoyo River
 Yaguachi River
 Milagro River
 Chimbo River
 Chanchán River
 Vinces River
 Palenque River
 Catarama River
 Zapotal River
 San Pablo River
 Cañar River
 Balao River
 Jubones River
 Arenillas River
 Zarumilla River
 Tumbes River
 Puyango River
 Chira River
 Catamayo River
 Calvas River

See also
 List of rivers of the Americas by coastline

Citations

References

 Rand McNally, The New International Atlas, 1993.
  GEOnet Names Server
 Water Resources Assessment of Ecuador

Ecuador
 
Rivers